Henry I (December 1127 – 16 March 1181), known as the Liberal, was count of Champagne from 1152 to 1181. He was the eldest son of Count Theobald II of Champagne, who was also count of Blois, and his wife, Matilda of Carinthia.

Biography
Henry took part in the Second Crusade under the leadership of Louis VII of France. He carried a letter of recommendation from Bernard of Clairvaux addressed to Manuel I Komnenos, Byzantine Emperor; he is listed among the notables present at the assembly held by Baldwin III of Jerusalem at Acre on 24 June 1148.

On his father's death, Henry chose to take Champagne, leaving the family's older holdings (including Blois, Chartres, Sancerre, and Châteaudun) to his younger brothers. At the time this may have been surprising, for the other territories were richer and better developed. Henry must have foreseen the economic possibilities of Champagne, and it is during his rule that the county achieved its high place as one of the richest and strongest of the French principalities.

Henry established orderly rule over the nobles of Champagne, and could fairly reliably count on the aid of some 2,000 vassals, which just by itself made him a power few in France could equal. This order in turn made Champagne a safe place for merchants to gather, and under the count's protection the Champagne Fairs became a central part of long-distance trade and finance in medieval Europe.

In addition, the count's court in Troyes became a renowned literary center. Walter Map was among those who found hospitality there. The scholar Stephen of Alinerre was among Henry's courtiers, becoming chancellor of the county in 1176.

In 1179, Henry went to Jerusalem again with a party of French knights including his relatives Peter of Courtenay (brother of Louis VII) and Philip of Dreux, bishop of Beauvais. Henry returned towards Europe by the land route across Asia Minor, and was captured and held to ransom by Kilij Arslan II, Seljuk sultan of Rüm. The ransom was paid by the Byzantine Emperor. Henry died on 16 March 1181.

In 1164, Henry married Marie of France, daughter of Louis VII of France and Eleanor of Aquitaine.

They had four children:

 Scholastique of Champagne (died 1219), married William IV of Mâcon
 Henry II (1166–1197)
 Marie of Champagne (died 1204), married Baldwin I of Constantinople
 Theobald III of Champagne (1179–1201)

Henry built the collegiate church of Saint-Étienne in Troyes between 1157 and 1171, which he planned as a necropolis for the House of Blois. He was buried there, as was his son Theobald III, but most of his descendants were buried elsewhere.

He was succeeded by their elder son Henry. After Henry became king of Jerusalem his younger brother, Theobald, became count.

References

Sources

1181 deaths
Henry I, Count of Champagne
Christians of the Second Crusade
1127 births
House of Blois